Deep Shrestha is a Nepalese singer and musician. Deep Shrestha is one of the coaches in The Voice of Nepal Season 1 (2018) and 2 (2019). "Jhaskiyecha Maan Mero", "Biteka Kura Le" and "Ma Ta Door Dekhi Aye" are among his popular songs.

Early life
Shrestha composed his first song "Ma Patharko Deuta Haina" when he was 14. He comes from a musical family in Dharan, Nepal. His father Jaya Narayan Shrestha was an ustaad and played violin and flute. His mother Indira Shrestha was a singer. Deep met other musicians early through his father.

Deep Shrestha studied bioscience after he passed his SLC exams. He thought that he would continue his studies but he missed his exams thrice because he was busy performing as a musician.

Career 
Shrestha formally started his musical career in the late 1960s. This era is deemed as the golden era of Nepali modern music. Before this he performed in cultural programs and other locally organized functions in eastern Nepal. His opportunity to officially pursue music came when a Dharan theatre team came to Kathmandu to stage a drama in Rastriya Nachghar, including the Late King Mahendra. Shrestha portrayed a singer. His melodious voice and well-composed music held everyone spellbound. King Mahendra was so impressed that he allowed Shrestha to record as many songs as he wished. In 2025 (Bikram Sambat), when even established singers had to wait for many days to schedule a recording session at Radio Nepal (the only recording studio then), he was allowed to record six songs. In subsequent years, Shrestha came to Kathmandu once in a year to record. After 2028 B.S., Shrestha started participating in the Nationwide Music Competition, which led to a first prize in vocals in 2030 B.S. for the song "Bidhawako Sindoorko Rahar".

Shrestha was musically active for another decade. Then, slowly, he stopped singing. He was busy with his official work and 'did not feel like recording new songs'. The Nepalese music industry expanded and professionalized. Technology drew him back and he again started singing.

Personal life
He married Sophiya Gurung who is originally from Darjeeling. They have two daughters. He works as an assistant music director at the Nepal Academy, Nepal. Shrestha has enriched the anthology of Nepali music with hundreds of modern and patriotic songs.

Awards
 	Best Male Vocal, Radio Nepal – 1970
 	Best Male Vocal, Radio Nepal – 1971
 	Best Male Vocal, Gold Medal, Radio Nepal – 1973
 	Best Male Vocal Award, All Nepal Music Competition – 1983
 	Chhinnalata Purashkar – 1993
 	Radio Nepal, Samman Patra – 13 April 1999
 	San Miguel Music Award – 2000
 	Swar Sangam Sangitalaya, Biratnagar, Samman Patra – 2000
 	Record of the Year, Hits FM Music Awards – 2001
 	Best Male Vocal, Hits FM Music Awards – 2001
 	Album of the Year, Hits FM Music Awards – 2001
 	Best Vocal Performance, 6th Annual Image Award – 2003
 	SEBA, Samman Patra – 27 May 2003
 	Purvanchal Auddhogik Byapar Mela, Samman Patra – 17 February 2004
 	Shri Rashtriya Jagriti Club, Itahari, Samman Patra – 10 November 2004
 	Sadhana, Samman Patra – 10 July 2005
 	Gorkha Dakshin Bahu, Fourth – 17 July 2005
 	Image Lifetime Achievement Award – 2007
 	Narayani Kala Mandir, Samman Patra – 3 January 2009.
 	Kalanidhi Indira Sangeet Maha Vidyalaya, Samman Patra – 9 April 2009
 	The Creative Hands of Nepal, Samman Patra – 8 October 2010
 	Humdard, Samman Patra – 2010
 	Purvanchal Sanskritik Sambardhan, Samman Patra
 	Best Male Vocal Performance, Hits FM Award – 2010
 	Best Male Vocal Performance, Image Award – 2012
 	Best Song of the Year, Image Award – 2012

Discography
 	Best of Narayan Gopal and Deep Shrestha (Ratna Records)
 	Abhas, Part I & II (Cassettes – Nepal Television)
 	Best of Deep Shrestha (CD, Cassettes – Melody Times)
 	Bhajanaamrit (Cassettes – DS Music Nepal)
 	Drisht (CD, Cassettes –  DS Music Nepal)
 	Shrinkhala (Music.com and DS Music Nepal)
 	Aavriti (CD – DS Music Nepal)
 	Antara (CD, DVD – DS Music Nepal)
 	Yatra – I (CD – Music.com)
 	Yatra – II (CD – Asian Music)

TV
 The Voice of Nepal Season 1, 2 & 3 as a coach

References

Living people
21st-century Nepalese male singers
20th-century Nepalese male singers
People from Dharan
Year of birth missing (living people)